Mullivaikkal(Mu’l’livaaykkaal) is a village located in Mullaitivu District, Vanni, Northern Province, Sri Lanka. The Mullivaikkal Massacre took place here in the final days of the Sri Lankan Civil War.

References

Villages in Mullaitivu District
Maritimepattu DS Division